The 1991–92 Stuttgarter Kickers season is the 92nd season in the club's football history. In 1991–92 the club plays in the Bundesliga, the first tier of German football. It is the club's first season back in this league, having been promoted from the Regionalliga in 1991. The club also takes part in the 1991–92 edition of the DFB-Pokal.

Squad information

Squad and statistics

External links
 1991-92 Stuttgarter Kickers season at Kickersarchiv.de 
 1991–92 Stuttgarter Kickers season at Weltfussball.de 
 1991–92 Stuttgarter Kickers season at kicker.de 
 1991–92 Stuttgarter Kickers season at Fussballdaten.de 

Stuttgarter Kickers
Stuttgarter Kickers seasons